Philip Rabinowitz may refer to:

Philip Rabinowitz (mathematician) (1926–2006), applied mathematician
Philip Rabinowitz (runner) (1904–2008), Lithuanian-born South African world record holder as the fastest centenarian